Amelia Griffiths (1768–1858), often referred to in contemporary works as Mrs Griffiths of Torquay, was a beachcomber and amateur phycologist who made many important collections of marine algae specimens.

Personal life
Amelia Warren Rogers was born 14 January 1768 in Pilton, Devon, UK. Her parents were John and Emily (née Warren) Rogers. She married Rev. William Griffiths, the vicar of St Issey, Cornwall, in 1794, but after his death, she moved her family of five children to Torquay. She died in Torquay on 4 January 1858.

Collaboration and dedications
She corresponded with the botanist William Henry Harvey for many years, becoming a close friend. They met at Torquay in 1839.

Harvey dedicated his 1849 Manual of British Algae to her, and once wrote 
Carl Adolph Agardh named Griffithsia in her honour in 1817.

One of her servants, Mary Wyatt, became involved in collecting and selling books of seaweeds as part of her business selling collectables and local souvenirs with assistance from Griffiths.

Described species
Griffiths was the first to describe Ceramium agardhianum A.W.Griffiths ex Harvey 1841 (now C. deslongchampsii) and the species Ceramium botryocarpum in 1844.

Collections
She collected a large number of specimens. Some were sent to other collectors or scientists while she mounted others in albums herself. After her death, her own herbarium became part of Torquay Museum and there are 3 albums of her specimens in Exeter's Royal Albert Memorial Museum. Others became part of the collections in the British Museum, including 780 British seaweeds purchased in 1852 and 880 specimens presented by the North Devon Athenaeum in 1917.  She had also provided material to other collectors and these have also found their way into national collections. In addition, some are now within the Kew Herbarium. Her daughter, Amelia Elizabeth Griffiths (1802-1861), also collected seaweeds and some of her collections have been mistaken for those of her mother.

See also
Timeline of women in science

References

18th-century British botanists
British phycologists
1768 births
1858 deaths
Women botanists
Women phycologists
19th-century British botanists
19th-century British women scientists